Ian Kenneth Stewart (born April 5, 1985) is a former American professional baseball third baseman. He played in Major League Baseball (MLB) for the Colorado Rockies, Chicago Cubs and Los Angeles Angels of Anaheim.

Baseball career

Colorado Rockies
Drafted in the 2003 MLB draft first round out of La Quinta High School in Westminster, California, Stewart showed great promise in short-season rookie-league ball with the Casper Rockies in the Pioneer League. His .401 on-base percentage and .558 slugging average appeared to justify his first-round selection. In 2004, Stewart continued to progress in low-A ball at Asheville in the South Atlantic League with a .398 OBP and .594 SLG. Baseball America ranked him as the fourth best prospect in baseball behind Delmon Young, Félix Hernández and Joe Mauer.

In 2005, he began play in high-A ball in Modesto, California in the California League. He got off to a very slow start, hitting for a low average with little power. He went to extended spring training and came back to play with Modesto in June, 2005. Up until June 20, Stewart was hitting under .230 with few homers. However, Stewart rebounded later in the season and finished with a respectable .353 OBP and .497 SLG, although he showed a worrisome tendency to strike out.

Stewart played in the Arizona Fall League after the conclusion of the 2005 minor league season. Here, Stewart got off to a good start with impressive power. Unfortunately, he suffered a wrist injury while sliding into second base. The MRI showed limited damage, but any wrist injury is troublesome for a power hitter. He was shut down for the rest of the AFL.

Stewart was invited to the Colorado Rockies 2006 spring training. He began well, hitting six home runs and batting over .400 in the first few games. Stewart re-established himself as a power-hitting prospect, and the Rockies sent him to Tulsa, Oklahoma in the AA Texas League. Here Stewart began the season well, but fell into a slump that sent his average to .235 in mid-May before being sidelined with another injury. The injury was not serious, and Stewart only missed ten games. When he returned, Stewart improved noticeably and finished the season with a .351 on-base percentage and a .452 slugging average.  In 2007, he was selected to the All-Star Futures Game.

Stewart had his contract purchased on August 11, 2007, when Jeff Baker was placed on the disabled list. He made his major league debut on that same day when he started the game at third base. He was hitless in 2 at-bats but scored a run after he was hit by a pitch. His first hit was a double off Kerry Wood of the Chicago Cubs on August 12. He hit his first major league home run, a grand slam on August 21, 2007, against Tony Armas Jr. of the Pittsburgh Pirates, making him only the second Rockie ever to hit a grand slam as his first major league home run.

He struggled early, striking out 28 times in his first 55 ABs, and was sent down to Colorado Springs to regain his hitting stroke. He found it once again, and was called back to the Majors on July 19. Stewart won the starting third base job when Garrett Atkins moved to first base in place for the injured Todd Helton.

Stewart received the NL Rookie of the Month award for his accomplishments in July 2008.  He hit .432 with one home run, five doubles, eight runs scored and 15 RBIs in 12 games during the month of July. He also had a .614 slugging percentage and a .519 on-base percentage.

After being the Rockies regular third baseman for most of 2009 and 2010, he split 2011 between the Majors and AAA. In parts of 5 seasons with the Rockies, he hit .236 with 54 home runs and 187 RBI in 432 games.

Chicago Cubs

On December 8, 2011, Stewart was traded from the Colorado Rockies along with Casey Weathers to the Chicago Cubs for Tyler Colvin and DJ LeMahieu.

He started the season playing third base with occasional starts by Jeff Baker, another former Rockie.  On July 16, 2012, Stewart underwent wrist surgery and was put on the 60-day disabled list. In 55 games he hit .201 with 5 home runs and 17 RBI.

On December 6, 2012, Stewart re-signed a 1-year $2 million deal with the Cubs. He played in 40 games with the AAA Iowa Cubs, hitting .168. In June 2013, Stewart was suspended ten games for making critical comments about the team on Twitter, which led to his release on June 25.

Los Angeles Dodgers
On July 5, 2013 he signed a minor league contract with the Los Angeles Dodgers, who assigned him to the AAA Albuquerque Isotopes. He hit just .174 in 27 games before he was released on August 12.

Los Angeles Angels of Anaheim
On January 22, 2014, Stewart signed a minor league deal with the Los Angeles Angels of Anaheim. Stewart won a bench role with the Angels after a strong spring training. He was designated for assignment on July 19, 2014.

Washington Nationals
On December 26, 2014, Stewart signed a minor league contract with the Washington Nationals. He was released by the team in June.

References

External links

1985 births
Living people
People from Westminster, California
Baseball players from California
Major League Baseball third basemen
Colorado Rockies players
Chicago Cubs players
Los Angeles Angels players
Casper Rockies players
Asheville Tourists players
Modesto Nuts players
Tulsa Drillers players
Colorado Springs Sky Sox players
Iowa Cubs players
Albuquerque Isotopes players
Salt Lake Bees players
Peoria Javelinas players
Syracuse Chiefs players